The siege of Salto occurred during the Uruguayan War, from 22 until 28 November 1864, when Brazilian forces (under Marquis of Tamandaré) and Colorado forces (under Venancio Flores) attempted to capture the city of Salto in Uruguay from its Uruguayan Army defenders.

Two Brazilian gunboats under First Lieutenant Joaquim José Pinto blockaded the town. On 24 November, Flores arrived with his troops and began the siege. Colonel José Palomeque, commander of the Uruguayan garrison, surrendered almost without firing a shot, on the afternoon of 28 November. Flores' army captured and incorporated four artillery pieces and 250 men; 300 Colorados and 150 Brazilians were left behind to occupy the town.

References

Bibliography

 
 
 
 
 

Military history of Brazil
Military history of Uruguay
Salto
Battles of the Uruguayan War